Firby is a village in North Yorkshire, England,  south west of Malton.

Firby was historically a township in the parish of Westow in the East Riding of Yorkshire.  It became a civil parish in 1866.  In 1935 the civil parish was enlarged when the civil parish of Kirkham was abolished and merged into it. In 1974 it was transferred to the new county of North Yorkshire, and when the civil parish of Firby was abolished in 1986 it rejoined the parish of Westow.

Firby Hall is a Grade II listed building, built in the 18th century and now divided into flats.

References

External links 

Villages in North Yorkshire
Former civil parishes in North Yorkshire